Vaniyamkulam is an old town and an important trading hub of Southern Malabar in Kerala state, India, particularly of livestock arriving from the neighbouring state of Tamil Nadu. The name derived from 'Vaniyan', connected with a trading community. It is part of the Palakkad District.

History
During Chera Perumals, this place was under Chera Kingdom, under Nedunganad. This is close to Kothakursi, a place where Chera rulers first settled in Malabar area. Kotha is the pet name of Chera Rulers. Although Malayalam is the spoken language, it has a sizable population of Tamil speaking people. The weekly market on Thursdays attracts traders and shoppers from far and wide.
Even elephants were traded at this market in the olden days.

This place was originally part of the Valluvanad Swaroopam dynasty.'''

Valluvanad was an erstwhile late medieval feudal state in present state of Kerala in South India extending from the Bharathapuzha River in the south to the Pandalur Mala in the north during their zenith in the early Middle Ages. On the west, it was bounded by the Arabian Sea at the port Ponnani and on the east by Attappadi Hills. According to local legends, the last Later Chera ruler gave a vast extension of land in South Malabar to one of their governors, Valluvakkonithiri and left for a hajj. The Valluvakkonithiri was also given last Later Chera ruler's shield (presumably to defend himself from the sword received by the Samoothiri (Zamorin) of Kozhikode, another governor, from the departing ruler). Not surprisingly, the Vellatiri rajas were hereditary enemies of the Samoothiri. Valluvanad is famous for the Mamankam festivals, held once in 12 years and the endless wars against the Samoothiri of Kozhikode. By the late 18th century, Vellatiri or Walluwanad proper was the sole remaining territory of the Walluvanad raja (Valluva Konatiri), who once exercised suzerain rights over a large portion of Southern Malabar. Although management of the country was restored to the Vellatiri raja in 1792, it soon became evident that he was powerless to repress the trouble that quickly broke out between Mapillas (favored by the Mysorean occupiers) and nayars (who sought to restore the ancien régime), and already in 1793 management of the district had to be resumed as the chief and his family fled to Travancore.

Demographics

The town has a population of nearly one hundred thousand people. It is connected by roads with other important towns in the region, namely Ottapalam, Pattambi Shoranur and Cherpulassery.

Education
TRKHSS is one of the best higher secondary schools in Palakkad District and is situated in Vaniyamkulam.

P.K. Das Institute of Medical Sciences is a state of the art superspecialty hospital cum medical college located in Vaniyamkulam town near the highway.

Nehru College of Nursing, Vaniyamkulam is a nursing institute one among a few of its kind to facilitate quality education in the health care field.

Temples
 Ariyankavu temple
 Killikavu temple, Pulachithra
 Swami Ayyappa Temple, Panayur
 MariAmman Temple
 Kothayur Siva temple
 Psharikkal Kavu
 Ayyappa Bhajana Madam
 Panayur Siva temple
 Ayyappa Temple, Panayur
 Murukan kovil, Pulachithra
 Siva Temple, Cherukattupulam
 Ayyapankavu, Cherukattupulam
 Pathamkulam Temple

Famous Houses
 Karath House- Panayur, Vaniamkulam
Chottathodi House 
 Deepam - Panayur Road, Vaniyamkulam
 Anugraha - Panayur Road, Vaniyamkulam
 Krishna Nivas (cherakke) - Ppanayur Road, Vaniyamkulam
 Padikkal house - Vaniyamkulam
Chakkolath House- Panayur
 Pulavar Nivas - Padmasree Ramachandra Pulavar
 Konath House - Pavukonam
 Kakkarath House - Vaniyamkulam

Developments and business 
 P K DAS Institute of Medical Sciences (Medical College & Super Speciality Hospital), Vaniyamkulam
 Nehru College of Nursing, Vaniyamkulam
 Mini Industrial Estate, Panayur Road, Vaniyamkulam
 Tholpavakoothu Kala Kendram - Koonathara (Traditional arts theatre)

Transportation
This town connects to other parts of India through Palakkad city.  National Highway No.544 connects to Coimbatore and Bangalore.  Other parts of Kerala is accessed through National Highway No.66 going through Thrissur. Calicut International Airport, Cochin International Airport and Coimbatore Airports are the nearest airports. Shoranur Junction railway station and Ottapalam Railway Station are the nearest railway stations.

References

Cities and towns in Palakkad district